Cristian Bustos Costa (born 29 May 1983) is a Spanish former footballer who played as a defensive midfielder.

Having reached the professionals at the age of 24, he amassed Segunda División totals of 226 games and one goal, mainly at the service of Celta. He also competed in La Liga with the club, in the 2012–13 season.

Club career

Early career and Celta
Bustos was born in Alicante, Valencian Community. He began his senior football career in the lower leagues, with CD Eldense, Pinoso CF, Real Murcia B, Hércules CF B, Hércules CF and Valencia CF Mestalla. In 2007, he signed for UD Salamanca, playing his first match as a professional on 26 August 2007 as he started in a 3–0 away loss against Málaga CF in the Segunda División, and went on to make 58 appearances in all competitions over two seasons before transferring to another club in that league, RC Celta de Vigo, on a four-year deal.

Bustos won promotion to La Liga with Celta in 2012, as runners-up. He made his debut in the competition on 18 August of that year, playing 79 minutes in a 0–1 home defeat to Málaga, and scored his first official goal for the side on 12 December, in a 2–1 win over Real Madrid at the Balaídos in the Copa del Rey.

As early as 8 January 2013, rumours arose of Bustos joining Sporting de Gijón, as a result of which he was left out of the squad to face Real Madrid in the second leg. The next day, he was loaned out to the club until June, and subsequently the agreement was extended for a further season.

Mallorca
Bustos' contract with Celta was terminated by mutual consent on 30 June 2014, and the following month he signed for RCD Mallorca of the second tier. He scored his first goal for his new team on 3 January 2015, in the 46th minute of a 2–0 home victory over Albacete Balompié.

Mumbai City
On 30 July 2015, Bustos moved to Indian Super League franchise Mumbai City FC; upon joining, the 32-year-old said that he was "excited for the opportunity to play outside Spain". He made his debut on 10 October, playing the full 90 minutes in a 0–0 away draw with Kerala Blasters FC.

Later years
Bustos retired in 2018 at the age of 35, following spells with Lorca FC and UCAM Murcia CF. In the 2016–17 campaign, the veteran contributed 40 games (playoffs included) as the former reached the second division for the first time ever.

Coaching
Subsequently, Bustos had assistant coach spells at several second-tier clubs under Aritz López Garai.

Club statistics

References

External links

Celta de Vigo biography 

1983 births
Living people
Footballers from Alicante
Spanish footballers
Association football midfielders
La Liga players
Segunda División players
Segunda División B players
Tercera División players
Divisiones Regionales de Fútbol players
CD Eldense footballers
Real Murcia Imperial players
Hércules CF B players
Hércules CF players
Valencia CF Mestalla footballers
UD Salamanca players
RC Celta de Vigo players
Sporting de Gijón players
RCD Mallorca players
Lorca FC players
UCAM Murcia CF players
Indian Super League players
Mumbai City FC players
Spanish expatriate footballers
Expatriate footballers in India
Spanish expatriate sportspeople in India